Robert William "Bevo" Nordmann (December 11, 1939 – August 24, 2015) was an American professional basketball player. He played college basketball for Saint Louis.

Born in St. Louis, Missouri, Nordmann was a 6'10" center who played at Saint Louis University from 1959 to 1961. He was named to the All-MVC First Team during his junior season, when he averaged 16 points per game.

In 1961, Nordmann was drafted by the Cincinnati Royals with the 25th pick in the NBA Draft. He appeared in four NBA seasons as a member of the Royals, St. Louis Hawks, New York Knicks and Boston Celtics, averaging 4.3 points per game.

After his basketball playing career ended, Nordmann served as an assistant coach at Michigan State University and Saint Louis University. He was inducted into Saint Louis' Hall of Fame in 2005. Nordmann died from cancer on August 24, 2015.

References

1939 births
2015 deaths
Allentown Jets players
American men's basketball coaches
American men's basketball players
Basketball coaches from Missouri
Basketball players from St. Louis
Boston Celtics players
Centers (basketball)
Cincinnati Royals draft picks
Cincinnati Royals players
Michigan State Spartans men's basketball coaches
New York Knicks players
People from DeWitt, Michigan
Saint Louis Billikens men's basketball coaches
Saint Louis Billikens men's basketball players
St. Louis Hawks players